The following is a list of churches in Fenland, a local government district in Cambridgeshire, England.

Map of medieval parish churches

Cambridgeshire

Central Cambridge

Active churches
There are churches in every civil parish. The district has an estimated 52 active churches for 100,200 inhabitants, a ratio of one church to every 1,927 people.

Defunct churches

References 

Fenland
 
Churches
Lists of buildings and structures in Cambridgeshire